The Modern Jazz Society Presents a Concert of Contemporary Music is an album of music composed by John Lewis and arranged and conducted by Gunther Schuller which was first released on the Norgran label.

Reception

Allmusic awarded the album three stars out of five. The Penguin Guide to Jazz awarded the album a "Crown" of recommended jazz recordings.

Track listing
All compositions by John Lewis
 Midsömmer" - 9:57
 "Little David's Fugue" - 5:33
 "The Queen's Fancy" - 4:52
 "Django" - 8:04
 "Sun Dance" - 3:16

Personnel 
John Lewis - supervisor, arranger
Gunther Schuller - French horn, arranger, conductor
J. J. Johnson - trombone 
Jim Poole - flute
Manny Ziegler - bassoon
Aaron Sachs (tracks 2, 4 & 5), Anthony Sciacca (tracks 1 & 3) - clarinet  
Stan Getz (tracks 1 & 3), Lucky Thompson (tracks 2, 4 & 5) - tenor saxophone
Percy Heath - bass
Connie Kay - drums

References 

1955 albums
John Lewis (pianist) albums
Norgran Records albums
Verve Records albums
Albums produced by Norman Granz
Albums conducted by Gunther Schuller